The 2011 National Assembly for Wales election was an election for the National Assembly. The poll was held on 5 May 2011 and decided the incumbency for all the Assembly's seats. It was the fourth election for seats in the National Assembly for Wales (previous elections having been held in 1999, 2003 and 2007), and the second election taken under the rules of the Government of Wales Act 2006.

The election resulted in gains for the incumbent Welsh Labour, which gained four seats compared to the previous election and now has 30 seats, exactly half of the Assembly. The party also secured a swing in its favour of over 10 percentage points. The Welsh Conservatives emerged as the largest opposition party with 14 seats, a net gain of two, but party leader Nick Bourne lost his seat. The junior party in the government coalition, the nationalist Plaid Cymru, suffered a drop in its vote and lost 4 seats. The Welsh Liberal Democrats lost significantly in the popular vote and returned five AMs, a loss of one.

British, Irish, Commonwealth and European Union citizens living in Wales aged eighteen or over on election day were entitled to vote. The deadline to register to vote in the election was midnight on 14 April 2011, though anyone who qualified as an anonymous elector had until midnight on 26 April 2011 to register.

It was held on the same day as elections for Northern Ireland's 26 local councils, the Scottish Parliament and Northern Irish Assembly elections, a number of local elections in England and the United Kingdom Alternative Vote referendum.

Electoral method
In general elections for the National Assembly for Wales, each voter has two votes in a mixed member system. The first vote may be used to vote for a candidate to become the Assembly Member for the voter's constituency, elected by the 'first past the post' system. The second vote may be used to vote for a regional closed party list of candidates. Additional member seats are allocated from the lists by the d'Hondt method, with constituency results being taken into account in the allocation. The overall result is approximately proportional.

Results
Overall turnout: 42.2%

|-
| style="background-color:white" colspan=15 | 
|-
!rowspan=3 colspan=2 | Parties
!colspan=10 | Additional member system
!rowspan=2 colspan=5 | Total seats
|-
!colspan=5 |Constituency
!colspan=5 |Region
|-
! Votes !! % !! +/− !! Seats !! +/− 
! Votes !! % !! +/− !! Seats !! +/−
! Total !! +/− !! %
|-

|-
|   || Total || 949,252 ||  ||  || 40 ||   || 949,388 ||  ||   || 20 ||  || 60 ||   || 
|}

(source:)

Votes summary

Opinion polls

Constituency Vote (FPTP)

Regional Vote (AMS)

Constituency and regional summary

Constituency nominations
NB: candidates in BOLD text were the incumbent assembly members. Non incumbents are represented in italics. Members elected 2011 are highlighted with party colours.

Regional lists

Mid and West Wales

North Wales

South Wales Central

South Wales East

South Wales West

Target seats for the main parties
Below are listed all the constituencies which required a swing of less than 7.5% from the 2007 result to change hands.

Labour targets

Plaid Cymru targets

Conservative targets

Liberal Democrat targets

New members
23 of the members elected to the Assembly in the election were not members of the previous Assembly.

Mick Antoniw, Labour, Pontypridd
Byron Davies, Welsh Conservative, South Wales West electoral region
Keith Davies, Labour, Llanelli
Suzy Davies, Welsh Conservative, South Wales West electoral region
Mark Drakeford, Labour, Cardiff West
Rebecca Evans, Labour, Mid and West Wales electoral region
Janet Finch-Saunders, Welsh Conservative, Aberconwy
Russell George, Welsh Conservative, Montgomeryshire
Vaughan Gething, Labour, Cardiff South and Penarth
Llyr Huws Gruffydd, Plaid Cymru, North Wales electoral region
Michael Hedges, Labour, Swansea East
Julie James, Labour, Swansea West 
Julie Morgan, Labour, Cardiff North
Eluned Parrott, Liberal Democrat, South Wales Central electoral region
William Powell, Liberal Democrat, Mid and West Wales electoral region
Gwyn Price, Labour, Islwyn
Jenny Rathbone, Labour, Cardiff Central
David Rees, Labour, Aberavon
Aled Roberts, Liberal Democrat, North Wales electoral region (see below)
Antoinette Sandbach, Welsh Conservative, North Wales electoral region
Ken Skates, Labour, Clwyd South
Simon Thomas, Plaid Cymru, Mid and West Wales electoral region
Lindsay Whittle, Plaid Cymru, South Wales East electoral region

On 17 May it was discovered that two of the newly elected AMs, John Dixon and Aled Roberts, held posts which disqualified them from election to the Assembly. Although they had formally taken their seats at the first meeting on 11 May, they were then removed from membership of Assembly. Both resigned the posts which had given rise to the disqualification. After taking legal advice, the Presiding Officer Rosemary Butler was told that she must formally declare their seats vacant on Friday 27 May, which would mean the candidates placed second on the list being elected unless motions were tabled to reinstate the two. Motions to reinstate Dixon and Roberts were subsequently tabled, and the Assembly Commission issued a press statement explaining the legal situation as they saw it.

The Liberal Democrats withdrew the motion to reinstate John Dixon on 5 July 2011, after the assembly standards commissioner Gerard Elias QC made clear that he had failed to take notice of the relevant rules. On 6 July, Eluned Parrott was sworn in as an AM in his place, and the Assembly voted to readmit Aled Roberts, as evidence showed that he had been directed to out-of-date information in Welsh.

Defeated members
8 incumbent AMs were defeated at the polls.

Eleanor Burnham, Liberal Democrat, North Wales electoral region
Nick Bourne, Welsh Conservative, Mid and West Wales electoral region
Nerys Evans, Plaid Cymru, Mid and West Wales electoral region
Chris Franks, Plaid Cymru, South Wales Central electoral region
Veronica German, Liberal Democrat, South Wales East electoral region 
Helen Mary Jones, Plaid Cymru, Llanelli
Dai Lloyd, Plaid Cymru, South Wales West electoral region 
Jonathan Morgan, Welsh Conservative, Cardiff North

Retiring members
The following incumbent AMs did not offer themselves for re-election:

Lorraine Barrett, Welsh Labour, Cardiff South and Penarth
Mick Bates, Independent (elected Liberal Democrat), Montgomeryshire
Alun Cairns, Welsh Conservative, South Wales West electoral region
Jane Davidson, Welsh Labour, Pontypridd
Andrew Davies, Welsh Labour, Swansea West
Brian Gibbons, Welsh Labour, Aberavon
Irene James, Welsh Labour, Islwyn
Gareth Jones, Plaid Cymru, Aberconwy
Trish Law, Independent, Blaenau Gwent
Val Lloyd, Welsh Labour, Swansea East
Rhodri Morgan, Welsh Labour, Cardiff West
Jenny Randerson, Liberal Democrat, Cardiff Central
Janet Ryder, Plaid Cymru, North Wales electoral region
Karen Sinclair, Welsh Labour, Clwyd South
Brynle Williams, Welsh Conservative, North Wales electoral region (died 1 April 2011).

See also
2011 Scottish Parliament election
2011 Northern Ireland Assembly election

Notes

References

2011
2011 elections in the United Kingdom
2011 in Wales
2010s elections in Wales